Adolfo Martín-Gamero y González-Posada (17 February 1917 – 1 September 1987) was a Spanish politician who served as Minister of Information and Tourism of Spain between 1975 and 1976, during the Francoist dictatorship.

References

1917 births
1987 deaths
Information and tourism ministers of Spain
Government ministers during the Francoist dictatorship